Brian Wynne Oakley,  (10 October 1927 – 17 August 2012) was a British civil servant and industrialist who took a leading role in the area of information technology, especially the 1980s Alvey Programme.

Career

Military service and education
In World War II, Oakley served with the Royal Signals as a subaltern. He then studied science at Exeter College, Oxford.

Information technology
In 1950 he joined the Telecommunications Research Establishment (TRE) where he undertook research in telecommunications and civilian applications of military research. He then worked in Whitehall as a civil servant, joining the Ministry of Technology under the Harold Wilson government in 1969. Subsequently, he became the chief official of the Science and Engineering Research Council (SERC).

Oakley was director of the United Kingdom Alvey Programme (1983–87), a British government-sponsored research programme for projects in the area of information technology, initiated as a reaction to the Japanese Fifth generation computer project.
He went on to be chairman of the software company Logica.
He chaired the managing board of the Computer Centre of the University of London, an important UK supercomputing centre, and was a director of the European Initiative for Quantum Computing.

From 1988–89, Oakley was president of the British Computer Society.
In 1991, on hearing that British Telecom planned to dispose of its site at Bletchley Park for housing, together with Tony Sale, he helped to save the site and establish the Bletchley Park Trust and became a director of the Trust. He was chairman of the Computer Conservation Society from 1996 to 2000.

Awards and recognition
Oakley was a Commander of the Order of the British Empire. He received honorary doctorates from Sheffield Hallam University (1994) and the University of Essex (1998).

References

1927 births
2012 deaths
Alumni of Exeter College, Oxford
Bletchley Park people
British chief executives
British civil servants
British computer scientists
Commanders of the Order of the British Empire
History of computing in the United Kingdom
People in information technology
Fellows of the British Computer Society
Fellows of the Institute of Physics
Presidents of the British Computer Society
British Army personnel of World War II
Royal Corps of Signals officers
20th-century British businesspeople